Feel the Heat is the debut studio album by Australian band The Radiators. The album as released in March 1980 and peaked at number 22 on the Australian Albums Chart and was certified platinum, selling 90,000 copies. A limited edition featured a bonus disc with the tracks "Fess' Song" and "Gimme Head".

The Radiators became the first Australian band to have advance/pre-sales on a début album with 6,000 copies being shifted before its release.

Track listing

Charts

References

The Radiators (Australian band) albums
1980 debut albums